Salvation is an American suspense drama television series, that premiered on July 12, 2017. The series was originally announced as being developed in September 2013, but received its straight-to-series 13-episode order in October 2016. On October 18, 2017, CBS renewed the series for a 13-episode second season, which premiered on June 25, 2018. On November 20, 2018, CBS canceled the series after two seasons.

Premise  
The show centers on the discovery of an asteroid that will impact the Earth in just six months, highlighting the attempts to prevent it and its worldwide ramifications. The show looks at how different individuals and groups of people react to the impending doom.

Cast

Main
 Santiago Cabrera as Darius Tanz, a billionaire scientist who is the founder and CEO of Tanz Industries and a pivotal player in the United States' defense against the impending asteroid. Darius briefly serves as the Vice President of the United States before becoming president after President Mackenzie's assassination.
 Jennifer Finnigan as Grace Barrows, the Pentagon press secretary, later senior advisor to President Mackenzie and later President Tanz; she has an intimate relationship with Harris Edwards, Deputy Secretary, and later, Secretary of Defense, and works with Darius to prevent the asteroid collision.
 Charlie Rowe as Liam Cole, a student at MIT and later Darius' protégé; he is one of the first people outside the government to predict the asteroid's impending collision with Earth. He and Darius work together on an EM drive for a gravity tractor they hope to use to change the asteroid's course.
 Jacqueline Byers as Jillian Hayes, a science fiction writer from Boston who becomes involved with Liam and is later chosen by Darius to pick 160 survivors to leave Earth if the asteroid collision cannot be stopped.
 Rachel Drance as Zoe Barrows (season 1; recurring season 2), Grace's daughter 
 Shazi Raja as Amanda Neel (season 1), an investigative reporter who is searching for the truth about Darius' and the government's secrets. After learning about the asteroid, Amanda is assassinated before she can publish the story.
 Ian Anthony Dale as Harris Edwards, a graduate of the United States Air Force Academy who now serves as the United States Deputy Secretary of Defense and is one of the few people in Washington, D.C. who knows of the asteroid's impending impact. He is described as a skilled operative but an even better bureaucrat. After his superior is fired, he is promoted to Secretary of Defense.
 Ashley Thomas as Alonzo Carter (season 2), a detective with the D.C. police who is investigating the disappearance of Claire Rayburn
 Melia Kreiling as Alycia Vrettou (season 2), a brilliant computer scientist, former protégé of Darius Tanz, and member of RE/SYST, leading an international group of captive scientists to come up with a plan to prevent the asteroid collision

Recurring  
 Dennis Boutsikaris as Malcolm Croft, a professor at MIT and Liam's mentor
 Erica Luttrell as Claire Rayburn, Senior Adviser and later White House Chief of Staff to President Monroe Bennett.
 Tovah Feldshuh as Pauline Mackenzie, the President of the United States
 Josette Jorge as Karissa (season 1), Darius' assistant
 Sasha Roiz as Monroe Bennett, the vice president, and later president, of the United States
 Mark Moses as Hugh Keating, Grace's father and former CIA agent
 Brian Markinson as Randall Calhoun (season 1), the United States Secretary of Defense who is later fired by President Mackenzie and replaced by Harris Edwards.
 Jeffrey Nordling as Daniel Hayes (season 1), Jillian's father and a bookseller
 John Noble as Nicholas Tanz, Darius' uncle and Chairman of the Board of Directors at Tanz Industries.
 Raven Dauda (season 1) as  Harris' secretary
 Autumn Reeser as Theresa (season 1), aka Tess, Darius' first love
 André Dae Kim as Dylan Edwards (recurring season 1, guest season 2), Harris' son and a member of the hacker organization RE/SYST
 Taylor Cole as Fiona Lane (guest season 1; recurring season 2), a bartender with whom Harris Edwards has an affair, but who later is revealed to have a connection to Darius' plans to save humanity
 Madison Smith as Nate Ryland (season 2), a co-worker, a later friend, of Jillian's in the White House
 Jonathan Silverman as Roland Kavanaugh (season 2), the White House Counsel
 Anjali Jay as Dr. Rosetta Stendahl (season 2), an old friend of Darius' and a brilliant scientist. She joins Darius and leads the project to prepare a rail-gun intended to help divert the asteroid.
 Luke Arnold as Bass Shepherd (season 2), the spiritual leader of Children of Planet Earth (COPE), a support group that Jillian joins
Manoj Sood as Dr. Chandra (season 2), an international specialist in Orbital Dynamics and General Purturbation Theory
James Lesure as Trey Thompson (season 2), a two-term congressman and former NASA pilot who is later named Vice President under Tanz.

Episodes

Season 1 (2017)

Season 2 (2018)

Production

The first season was filmed in Toronto, Ontario. The show relocated to Vancouver, British Columbia for its second season.

Reception

On the review aggregator website Rotten Tomatoes, the series has an approval rating of 47% based on 17 reviews, with an average rating of 5.75/10. The site's critical consensus reads: "Neither remarkably bad nor impressively well-made, Salvation is stereotypical summer television – a low-stakes diversion that may pass the time well enough for undemanding audiences without ever being particularly memorable along the way." On Metacritic, the series has a score of 48 out of 100, based on 18 critics, indicating "mixed or average reviews".

Ratings

Season 1

Season 2

Awards and nominations

Home media

References

External links
 

2010s American drama television series
2010s American science fiction television series
2017 American television series debuts
2018 American television series endings
2010s American political television series
American thriller television series
Apocalyptic television series
English-language television shows
CBS original programming
Television series by CBS Studios
Television shows filmed in Toronto
Television shows filmed in Vancouver
Television shows set in Washington, D.C.